Tan Sri Low Yow Chuan (刘耀全) (20 September 1932 – 8 May 2021) was a Malaysian real estate and property developer. Low Yow Chuan and his four children own the Federal Hotel, which includes Hotel Capitol, Low Yat Plaza, and the Bintang Fairlane Residences, as well as other area properties.

Yow Chuan was Board Member at Asia Pacific Land until 2002. Following his retirement from the role, he continued to serve as Group Adviser for the company. As of 2006, the executive chairman position was held by his eldest son Low Gee Tat, while his other three children hold directorship positions.

Personal life
He was born to a Chinese father, Low Yat, who in 1957 built Malaya's first international class hotel, Federal Hotel in Kuala Lumpur. Yow Chuan’s father, the late Tan Sri Low Yat founded Low Yat Construction Company Sdn. Bhd. in 1947.

Yow Chuan studied architecture at the University of New South Wales, but in 1957, before he managed to graduate, he returned home to help with his father's business.

Death 
Yow Chuan died at the age 88 on 8 May 2021.

Honours

Honours of Malaysia
 
  Commander of the Order of Loyalty to the Crown of Malaysia (PSM) – Tan Sri (1992)

Awards
In 2014 he received the  Mayor's Commendable Award of the Kuala Lumpur Mayor’s Tourism Awards 2014 for his significant contribution to the local tourism sector since the 1960s.

Places named after him
 Yow Chuan Plaza, Jalan Ampang/Tun Razak. (Demolished, now The Intermark City Square)
 Persiaran Tan Sri Low Yow Chuan, Bandar Tasik Puteri, Rawang, Selangor

References

1932 births
2021 deaths
People from Kuala Lumpur
Malaysian people of Chinese descent
Chinese businesspeople
Malaysian businesspeople
Malaysian hoteliers
Real estate and property developers
University of New South Wales alumni
Commanders of the Order of Loyalty to the Crown of Malaysia